Isopyrum thalictroides is a species of flowering plant belonging to the family Ranunculaceae.

Its native range is Europe.

References

Ranunculaceae